What a Way to Go may refer to:

What a Way to Go!, a 1964 feature film
What a Way to Go: Life at the End of Empire, a 2007 documentary film
"What a Way to Go" (song), a 1977 song by Bobby Borchers, also recorded by Ray Kennedy in 1990
 What a Way to Go (album), Ray Kennedy's 1990 album containing this song